Luna Peak may refer to:

 Luna Peak (Washington), a mountain in the US
 Luna Peak (British Columbia), a mountain in Canada